The Willemoes-class missile boat was a Royal Danish Navy class of fast missile boats serving from late 1970s until 2000. Their weapons consisted of one  OTO Melara gun and combination of RGM-84 Harpoon missiles and torpedo tubes. When the full assortment of eight Harpoons was carried, two  torpedo tubes were carried as well. With Harpoons removed, up to four torpedo tubes could be mounted.

The guided missile boat  is now a museum ship at Holmen.

List of ships

References 

 Flådens historie: Willemoes-klassen
 PEJČOCH, Ivo; NOVÁK, Zdeněk; HÁJEK, Tomáš. Válečné lodě 6 – Afrika, Blízký východ a část zemí Evropy po roce 1945. Praha : Ares, 1994. . pg. 63.

Torpedo boats
Missile boat classes
Ships of the Royal Danish Navy